Horseed International University is a university based in Banaadir, Mogadishu, Somalia.

References 

Universities in Somalia
Universities in Mogadishu